The 2019 Viterra Championship, Manitoba's provincial men's curling championship, was held from February 6 to 10 at the Tundra Oil and Gas Place in Virden. The winning Team Carruthers represented Manitoba at the 2019 Tim Hortons Brier, Canada's national men's curling championship in Brandon, Manitoba.

Teams
Teams are as follows:

Draw
The scores are as follows:

32 team double knockout with playoff round
Four teams qualify each from A Event and B Event

A Event

B Event

Playoffs

Playoff round
8 team double knockout
Four teams qualify into Championship Round

Championship round

1 vs. 2
February 9, 6:00pm

3 vs. 4

February 9, 6:00pm

Semifinal
February 10, 8:30am

Final
February 10, 3:00pm

References

2019 Tim Hortons Brier
Curling in Manitoba
2019 in Manitoba
Viterra Championship